Straloch House is a mansion house in the parish of New Macher, Aberdeenshire, Scotland. The mansion house stands on the site of the former castle of Straloch.

Straloch Castle
The Cheynes of Straloch came into the procession of the lands of Straloch in the 13th century through the marriage of Reginald le Chen (d.1312) and the heiress Mary, daughter of Freskin de Moravia of Duffus and Strabok and Johanna de Strathnaver, and was given to Reginald's second son Francis le Chen. It remained in the Cheyne family for over 250 years.

In the 16th century it was sold to John Gordon of Pitlurg. Robert Gordon the cartographer came into the possession afterwards.

Straloch House
The Gordon family sold the lands of Straloch in 1758 to John Ramsey, who demolished the tower house and built the existing mansion on the same site.

Notes

Category A listed buildings in Aberdeenshire
Clan Cheyne
Inventory of Gardens and Designed Landscapes